The 15th European Athletics Championships were held from 26 August to 2 September 1990 in Split, Croatia, SFR Yugoslavia. The host stadium was Stadion Poljud.

It was the last participation of East Germany (which was already scheduled to be merged with the Federal Republic), the Soviet Union, Czechoslovakia,  and SFR Yugoslavia.

Men's results
Complete results were published.

Track
1982 |1986 |1990 |1994 |1998 |

Field
1982 |1986 |1990 |1994 |1998 |

†: In long jump, bronze medalist Borut Bilač from Yugoslavia was initially disqualified for a suspected infringement of IAAF doping rules, but was later cleared of the charges and reinstated.
‡: In shot put, Vyacheslav Lykho from the Soviet Union ranked initially 3rd (20.81m), but was disqualified for infringement of IAAF doping rules.

Women's results

Track
1982 |1986 |1990 |1994 |1998 |

Field
1982 |1986 |1990 |1994 |1998 |

Medal table

Participation
According to an unofficial count, 914 athletes from 33 countries participated in the event, 39 athletes less than the official number of 952 as published. 

 (2)
 (11)
 (19)
 (20)
 (4)
 (17)
 (7)
 (67)
 (45)
 (67)
 Greece (11)
 (32)
 (6)
 (14)
 (3)
 (61)
 (2)
 (1)
 (1)
 (17)
 (18)
 (18)
 (32)
 (21)
 (1)
 (97)
 Spain (61)
 (25)
 (18)
 (8)
 (95)
 (68)
 (45)

See also
1990 in athletics (track and field)

References

European Championships (Women). GBR Athletics. Retrieved on 2012-06-26.
European Championships (Men). GBR Athletics. Retrieved on 2012-06-26.

 
European Athletics Championships
European Championships
European Athletics Championships
European Athletics Championships
European Athletics Championships
Sports competitions in Split, Croatia
1990 in European sport
1990 in Yugoslav sport
August 1990 sports events in Europe
September 1990 sports events in Europe
20th century in Split, Croatia